The Ladas was an English automobile manufactured in 1906.  It was named after the winning horse of the 1894 Derby.
James Bowen of Didsbury, Manchester, showed the single cylinder, 7 hp two-seater model at the February 1906 Manchester Motor Show. It was priced at £150 and it is unlikely that many more were made as Bowen sold the business in 1906 to a J.N. Aitken who from then on made Ladas bicycles and motor cycles.

See also 
 List of car manufacturers of the United Kingdom

References

Beaulieu Encyclopedia of the Automobile. Ed Nick Georgano. 2000. .

Defunct motor vehicle manufacturers of England